Scholastica is a Catholic saint.

Scholastica may also refer to:
Scholastica (company), a web-based software platform for managing academic journals

Schools
Scholastica (school), a private English medium school in Dhaka, Bangladesh
The College of St. Scholastica, in Duluth, Minnesota, US
St Scholastica's College (Australia), in Sydney, Australia
Scholastica school in Dhaka, Bangladesh
St. Scholastica's College Manila, Philippines
Several schools named St. Scholastica Academy (disambiguation)

Places
Abbaye Sainte-Scholastique in Dourgne, France
Sainte-Scholastique, Quebec in Canada

See also
 Scholastic (disambiguation)